The 2020 VCU Rams baseball team was the program's 50th baseball season, and their 8th season the Atlantic 10 Conference. The regular season began on February 14, 2020, and was scheduled to conclude on May 16, 2020. The season was cancelled on March 12, 2020, due to the COVID-19 pandemic. The Rams finished the season with a 9–8 record.

The Atlantic 10 Baseball Tournament was to be hosted by VCU and was to be held from May 20–23, 2020.

Preseason

A10 media poll
The Atlantic 10 baseball media poll was released on February 10, 2020. VCU was picked to win the Atlantic 10 regular season championship.

Roster

Game log

Rankings

Honors

Preseason honors

References

External links 
 VCU Baseball

Vcu
VCU Rams baseball seasons
VCU Rams baseball
VCU Rams baseball